The women's 4 x 400 metres relay event at the 2009 Summer Universiade was held on 12 July.

Results

References

Results (archived)

Relay
2009